The Pointe aux Canons Battery was a fort on the island of Saint Pierre in Saint Pierre and Miquelon built by the French to defend the islands from British attacks in 1690–1713. The 6 cannon battery was destroyed by the British in 1702.

The old cannon battery was replaced in the 19th century to defend the islands during the Crimean War. The Pointe aux Canons Lighthouse is located near the old fort site.

Four cannons now sit in a park near the site of the old fort, but traces of fort have disappeared with the development of the town.

References

French forts in St. Pierre and Miquelon
History of Saint Pierre and Miquelon
Buildings and structures in Saint Pierre and Miquelon
Saint Pierre Island
Artillery batteries